Francis of Paola, O.M., (or: Francesco di Paola or Francis the Fire Handler; 27 March 1416 – 2 April 1507) was an Italian mendicant friar and the founder of the Roman Catholic Order of Minims. Unlike the majority of founders of men's religious orders, and like his patron saint, Francis was never ordained a priest.

Biography 

Francis was born in the town of Paola, which lies in the southern Italian Province of Cosenza, Calabria. In his youth he was educated by the Franciscan friars in Paola. His parents, having remained childless for some years after their marriage, had recourse to prayer and especially commended themselves to the intercession of Francis of Assisi, after whom they named their first-born son. Two other children were eventually born to them.

When still in the cradle, Francis suffered from a swelling which endangered the sight of one of his eyes. His parents again had recourse to Francis of Assisi and made a vow that their son should pass an entire year wearing the "little habit" of St Francis in one of the friaries of his Order, a not-uncommon practice in the Middle Ages. The child subsequently recovered. At the age of 13, being admonished by a vision of a Franciscan friar, he entered a friary of the Franciscan Order to fulfill the vow made by his parents. At the completion of the year he went with his parents on a pilgrimage to Assisi, Rome, and other places of devotion. Returning to Paola, he selected a secluded cave on his father's estate and there lived in solitude; but later on he found an even-more secluded cave on the sea coast. Here he remained alone for about six years, giving himself to prayer and mortification.

Minim Friars 

In 1435 two companions joined him in his retreat, and to accommodate them Francis caused three cells and a chapel to be built: in this way the new order was begun. By 1436, he and two followers began a movement that would become the foundation of the Hermits of Saint Francis of Assisi, which would later be renamed as the Minim friars. Their name refers to their role as the "least of all the faithful". Humility was to be the hallmark of the brothers as it had been in Francis' personal life. Abstinence from meat and other animal products became a "fourth vow" of his religious order, along with the traditional vows of poverty, chastity and obedience. Francis instituted the continual, year-round observance of this diet in an effort to revive the tradition of fasting during Lent, which many Roman Catholics had ceased to practice by the 15th century. The rule of life adopted by Francis and his religious was one of extraordinary severity. He felt that heroic mortification was necessary as a means for spiritual growth. They were to seek to live unknown and hidden from the world.

The number of his disciples gradually increased, and about 1454, with the permission of Pyrrhus, Archbishop of Cosenza, Francis built a large monastery and church. The building of this monastery was the occasion of a great outburst of enthusiasm and devotion on the part of the people towards Francis: even the nobles carried stones and joined in the work. Their devotion was increased by the many miracles which Francis wrought in answer to their prayers.

In 1474 Pope Sixtus IV gave him permission to write a rule for his community, and to assume the title of Hermits of St. Francis: this rule was formally approved by Pope Alexander VI, who, however, changed their title into that of "Minims". After the approbation of the order, Francis founded several new monasteries in Calabria and Sicily. He also established monasteries of nuns, and a third order for people living in the world, after the example of Francis of Assisi. He was no respecter of persons based solely on their worldly rank or position. He rebuked the King of Naples for his ill-doing and in consequence suffered persecution.

France 

When King Louis XI of France was in his last illness, he sent an embassy to Calabria to beg Francis to visit him. Francis refused to come until the pope ordered him to go. Embarking at Ostia, he landed in France, and cured many sick of the plague in Provence as he passed. He then went to the king at his residence, the Château de Plessis-lez-Tours (now within the village of La Riche), and was with him at his death. He became a tutor of the heir, Charles VIII, who kept him near the court and frequently consulted him.

This king built a monastery for the Minims there near the chateau at Plessis and another at Rome on the Pincian Hill. Francis also influenced many in the French church, particularly Jan Standonck, who founded the Collège de Montaigu along what he thought were Minimist lines. The regard in which Charles VIII held him was shared by his successor, Louis XII, each  of whom insisted he remain in France.

Francis was now eager to return to Italy, but the king would not permit him, not wishing to lose his counsels and direction. Francis spent the last three months of his life in entire solitude, preparing for death. On Holy Thursday of 1507 he gathered his community around him and exhorted them especially to have mutual charity amongst themselves and to maintain the rigour of their life and in particular perpetual abstinence. The next day, Good Friday, he again called them together and gave them his last instructions and appointed a Vicar General. He died at Plessis on 2 April 1507 at the age of ninety-one.

Diet 

Francis followed a diet not only free from animal flesh, but also from all animal-derived foods, such as eggs and dairy products. One of the vows of the order he founded was the abstinence from meat, fish, eggs, butter, cheese and milk. Francis has been described as a vegan.

The two major movements in this order were humility and non-violence. The word "Minim" refers to living as the smallest or least, or embracing humility, simplicity, and plainness. The call to non-violence and absence of cruelty was expressed through not doing harm to any creature.

Gift of prophecy 

It was believed that Francis was favored with the gift of prophecy. He apparently foretold to several persons, in the years 1447, 1448, and 1449, the taking of Constantinople by the Turks, which happened on 29 May 1453, under the command of Mahomet II, when Constantine Palaeologus, the last Christian emperor, was killed in battle. 

Theodoor van Thulden painted a mystic episode that was said to have occurred over a century earlier. It depicts Francis of Paola, who was revered in France because he visited the country in 1482, at the bedside of Louise of Savoy to announce that she will give birth to the next king of France, the future Francis I. In 1515, King Louis XII died without a male heir and the throne went to Francis I, of the royal family's Valois-Angoulême branch. Louise of Savoy and her spouse, the Count of Angoulême, who is almost certainly the figure depicted to the left of the bed, decided to name the child Francis in honor of the saint.

Legends 

According to a famous story, in the year 1464, he was refused passage by a boatman while trying to cross the Strait of Messina to Sicily. He reportedly laid his cloak on the water, tied one end to his staff as a sail, and sailed across the strait with his companions following in the boat. The second of Franz Liszt's "Legendes" (for solo piano) describes this story in music.

After his nephew died, the boy's mother—Francis' own sister—appealed to Francis for comfort, and filled his apartment with lamentations. After the Mass and divine office had been said for the repose of his soul, Francis ordered the corpse to be carried from the church into his cell, where he continued praying until, to her great astonishment, the boy's life was restored and Francis presented him to his mother in perfect health. The young man entered his order and is the celebrated Nicholas Alesso who afterwards followed his uncle into France, and was famous for sanctity and many great actions.

There are several stories about his compassion for animals, and how he gave back life to animals that were killed to be eaten. For example, a biographer writes:
"Francis had a favorite trout that he called 'Antonella'. One day, one of the priests, who provided religious services, saw the trout swimming about in his pool. To him it was just a delicious dish, so he caught it and took it home, tossing it into the frying pan. Francis missed 'Antonella' and realized what had happened. He asked one of his followers to go to the priest to get it back. The priest, annoyed by this great concern for a mere fish, threw the cooked trout on the ground, shattering it into several pieces. The hermit sent by Francis gathered up the broken pieces in his hands and brought them back to Francis. Francis placed the pieces back in the pool and, looking up to Heaven and praying, said: 'Antonella, in the name of Charity, return to life.' The trout immediately became whole and swam joyously around his pool as if nothing had happened. The friars and the workers who witnessed this miracle were deeply impressed by the miracle."

Francis also raised his pet lamb from the dead after it had been killed and eaten by workmen. Being in need of food, the workmen caught and slaughtered Francis' pet lamb, Martinello, roasting it in their lime kiln. They were eating when Francis approached them, looking for the lamb. They told him they had eaten it, having no other food. He asked what they had done with the fleece and the bones. They told him they had thrown them into the furnace. Francis walked over to the furnace, looked into the fire and called 'Martinello, come out!' The lamb jumped out, completely untouched, bleating happily on seeing his master.

Francis of Paola called the animals by their names even after their lives had ended. He apparently believed they continued to exist after their deaths.

Legacy and veneration 

Pope Leo X canonized him in 1519. He is considered to be a patron saint of boatmen, mariners, and naval officers. His liturgical feast day is celebrated by the Roman Catholic Church on April 2nd, the day on which he died. In 1963, Pope John XXIII designated him as the patron saint of Calabria. Though his miracles were numerous, he was canonized for his humility and discernment in blending the contemplative life with the active one.

The Order of Minims does not seem at any time to have been very extensive, but they had houses in many countries. The definitive rule was approved in 1506 by Pope Julius II, who also approved a rule for the nuns of the Order. A Third Order of their movement was also approved. The most noted member of this Order was the illustrious French bishop, Francis de Sales. Although the Minim order lost many of its monasteries in the 18th century during the French Revolution, it continues to exist, primarily in Italy.

In 1562, a group of Protestant Huguenots in France broke open his tomb and found Francis' body incorrupt. They dragged it forth, burned it and scattered the bones, which were recovered by Catholic faithful and distributed as relics to various churches of his order.

Devotion of the Thirteen Fridays 

Pope Clement XII, in the brief Coelestium Munerum Dispensatio of 2 December 1738, promulgated an indulgence to all the faithful who, upon 13 Fridays continuously preceding the Feast of St. Francis of Paola (2 April), or at any other time of the year, shall, in honor of Francis, visit a church of the Minims and pray there for the church. In this brief, mention is made of a devotion which originated with Francis himself, who, on each of 13 Fridays, used to recite 13 Pater Nosters (Our Fathers) and as many Ave Marias (Hail Marys), and this devotion he promulgated by word of mouth and by letter to his own devout followers, as an efficacious means of obtaining from God the graces they desired, provided they were for the greater good of their souls.

See also 

 San Francesco di Paola, Naples

References

Sources and external links 

Catholic.org, Online entry for Francis of Paola
Herbert Thurston, The Physical Phenomena of Mysticism, pp. 174–75
 Founder Statue in St Peter's Basilica
 Colonnade Statue in St Peter's Square

1416 births
1507 deaths
15th-century Christian saints
15th-century Italian Christian monks
16th-century Christian saints
16th-century Italian Christian monks
Founders of Catholic religious communities
Italian hermits
Italian Roman Catholic saints
Incorrupt saints
Medieval Italian saints
Minims (religious order)
People from Paola, Calabria